Patra or Patara is a caste found in the Odisha State of India. Traditionally they are petty traders (silk-weavers) inside and outside of the village. They trade in cotton and silk yarn, vermilion, and sacred threads meant for various rites and rituals. They are also required to supply these materials to the village deity and also to the Hindu caste people of the village on various ceremonial such as religious occasions.

Social life 

They have two sub-divisions named, 1-Aswini Patara and 2-Gaudia Patara. They used the surnames includes; Kotual, Ash, Behera, Guin, Patra, Paramanik, Naha, Tosh, Sahoo, Dalal etc. The religious festivals like Pana Sankranti, Kanak Durga Puja and Hara Gouri Puja are mostly associated with the people of Patara community.

Status
They are included in the [Brahmins] in the state of Odisha and West Bengal.

Reference

Social groups of Odisha
Indian castes